The Whole Year is Christmas is a 1960 Argentine film.

Cast
  Raúl Rossi as Santa Claus
  Olga Zubarry as Esther (episode "Una mujer")
  Carlos Estrada as Enrique (episode "Una mujer")
  Nelly Meden as Marta (episode "El angelito")
  Leonardo Favio as Armando Echagüe / Roberto Echagüe (episode "El hermano")
  Ricardo Castro Ríos as Federico (episode "El angelito")
  Mabel Karr as Carmen (episode "Cobardía")
  Enrique Guarnero as Don Servando (episode "Violencia")
  Elcira Olivera Garcés		
  Pepita Serrador as Señora Echagüe (episode "El hermano")
  Narciso Ibáñez Serrador as Carmelo (episode "Cobardía")
  Oscar Orlegui as Angelito (episode "El angelito")
  Juan Carlos Altavista as Bromista (episode "Cobardía")

External links
 

1960 films
1960s Spanish-language films
Argentine black-and-white films
Films directed by Román Viñoly Barreto
Argentine Christmas films
1960s Argentine films